Samuel Mischitz (born 14 August 2003) is an Austrian professional footballer who plays as a right-back for Austrian Football Bundesliga club Rheindorf Altach. He has represented Austria at under-17 level.

Club career
Mischitz began his career with SV Lochau. In 2017, he moved to the regional academy of AKA Vorarlberg, where he progressed through all youth teams in the following four seasons. In September 2020, he signed a professional contract with Rheindorf Altach, which had already been reported as his first senior club ahead the 2020–21 season. Before the 2021–22 season, he was officially promoted to the first-team squad competing in the Austrian Football Bundesliga.

Mischitz made four appearances for the Altach reserves in the fourth-tier Vorarlbergliga, before he finally made his debut in the Bundesliga in August 2021, when he was in the starting eleven on the fifth matchday of that season against WSG Tirol.

International career
Mischitz made his debut for Austria under-16s on 23 October 2018, starting a 4–1 friendly loss against Poland. He made his first appearance at under-17 level one year later in a friendly against Switzerland; he marked the occasion by scoring his team's only goal in a 4–1 loss.

Career statistics

References

2003 births
Living people
Austrian footballers
Austria youth international footballers
People from Bregenz
Footballers from Vorarlberg
Association football midfielders
SC Rheindorf Altach players
Austrian Football Bundesliga players